Many computer systems are available in the commercial marketplace that address the various aspects of Business Process Management.  Most address one specific set of functionality; for instance, some allow the processes to be mapped (see Business Process Mapping) and documented (such as Visio); others allow for simulations to take place (such as ARIS).  But most of these are very limited in their ability to address the full requirements of BPM.

Procedure
Very few systems provide for full automation.  These allow the users to define the process flow and then enter the business rules' that generate the complete working system, including the database and all application logic.  They also provide full management facilities to manage the running of the processes (such as changing users when someone is off sick), as well as a complete history trail so that activity-based costing analyses can take place.  They also provide full statistical analyses (P and R measures) that allow the automated process to be changed and improved.

These system differ from all traditional IT developments in that everything is time based.  Traditional systems (often found as Legacy systems) are 'passive', in that they provide excellent functionality when specifically asked to do something - they will answer enquiries, process updates and produce reports.  Active systems are driven by time - in what sequence must activities happen; when must tasks be completed and by when; what happens if work misses a deadline; how are parallel activities to be resynchronised.  These facilities are all handled by true Automated Business Process systems.

External links
Operational Excellence - The Main Principles to Continuously Improve
MyCompanyWorks Review: Pricing, Customer Service, Pros & Cons

Business terms 
Workflow technology